Kokašice is a municipality and village in Tachov District in the Plzeň Region of the Czech Republic. It has about 300 inhabitants.

Administrative parts
Villages and hamlets of Čeliv, Krasíkov and Lomy are administrative parts of Kokašice.

Notable people
Franz Melnitzky (1822–1876), Austrian sculptor

References

Villages in Tachov District